Tobias Schützenauer (born 19 May 1997) is an Austrian footballer who plays for SK Sturm Graz.

Career

GAK Jugend
Shutzenauer started his youth career with GAK Jugend in 2010.

Sturm Graz
Schutzenauer started his career in the Sturm Graz youth system in July 2010. He worked his way up through the academy, playing for the U15 and U16 teams before getting a chance in the B-Team. He made 49 appearances for the B-Squad before getting promoted to the senior team on 7 January 2014. He made his first appearance for the senior squad on 24 May 2015 in a 2-1 victory over Admira Wacker. He came on in the 35th minute, replacing an injured Christian Gratzei.

References

External links
 Schutzenauer at Sturm Graz Official Website
 Schutzenauer at Soccerbase
 Schutzenauer at Soccerway

Austrian footballers
Austrian Football Bundesliga players
1997 births
Living people
SK Sturm Graz players
Association football goalkeepers